Charles Wilson (30 March 1895 – May 1971) was an English footballer who played in the Football League for Tottenham Hotspur, Huddersfield Town and Stoke City.

Career
Wilson was born in Atherstone, Warwickshire and began his career with local non-league side Atherstone Town before joining Southern League side Coventry City just before the outbreak of World War I. 

After being demobbed he played six times for Tottenham Hotspur in the 1918–19 season, although for reasons unknown he decided to hide his identity. In four of these games he played under the name of  "C. Williams" being described as a "clot from the Midlands" and in the other under the pseudonym of "C. Forshaw". Only in the sixth did he finally take to the field as Charlie Wilson. With the war over the Football League returned and Wilson scored a hat-trick on his Spurs debut proper in a 3–0 victory over South Shields at Horsley Hill in September 1919. He scored 11 goals for Spurs in the 1919–20 season helping them claim the old Second Division title.  

He scored 9 goals in 1920–21 and 11 in 1921–22 witch prompted Huddersfield Town manager Herbert Chapman to bring Wilson to Leeds Road. He soon became a key member of Towns all conquering 1920s side as he scored 16 goals in 1922–23 as Huddersfield finished in 3rd position. He then scored 20 goals in 1923–24 and 24 in 1924–25 as Huddersfield claimed the First Division title. However, with Huddersfield on their way to a third straight title Wilson picked up an injury early in the 1925–26 season and so decided to put him up for sale.

Stoke City manager Tom Mather persuaded Wilson to join the Victoria Ground side and he joined Stoke along with his Huddersfield Town teammate, Joey Williams. The pair could not prevent Stoke slipping to relegation to the Third Division North. In 1926–27 Wilson's quality in front of goal proved too much for Third Division defences as he racked up 26 goals as Stoke won the title with ease. Back in the Second Division for 1927–28 Wilson had a fine season scoring a club record 38 goals. He continued to be top scorer hitting 22 in 1928–29 and 20 in 1929–30 becoming the first Stoke player to reach 100 league goals. He struggled with injury in 1930–31 scoring 10 in 16 games and left the club at the end of the season.

After leaving Stoke he played non-league football with Stafford Rangers whilst keeping the Doxey Hotel. He later played for Wrexham, Shrewsbury Town and Alfreton United before later becoming landlord of the Noah's Ark pub in Stafford. He died in May 1971 at the age of 76.

Career statistics
Source:

Honours
Tottenham Hotspur
Football League Second Division Champions: 1919–20

Huddersfield Town
Football League First Division Champions (3): 1923–24, 1924–25, 1925–26

Stoke City
Football League Third Division North Champions: 1926–27

References

1895 births
1971 deaths
English footballers
People from Atherstone
Association football forwards
English Football League players
Atherstone Town F.C. players
Coventry City F.C. players
Tottenham Hotspur F.C. players
Huddersfield Town A.F.C. players
Stoke City F.C. players
Stafford Rangers F.C. players
Wrexham A.F.C. players
Shrewsbury Town F.C. players
Alfreton Town F.C. players